The 2004–05 Pontevedra Club de Fútbol season was the club's 64th season in existence and the club's first season in the second division of Spanish football since 1977. In addition to the domestic league, Pontevedra participated in this season's edition of the Copa del Rey. The team missed out on a second-year stay in the Segunda División in the penultimate matchday.

Players

First-team squad

Competitions

Overview

Segunda División

League table

Results summary

Results by round

Matches

Source:

Copa del Rey

Notes

References

External links

Pontevedra CF
Pontevedra CF